Octodon is a genus of octodontid rodents native to South America, in particular in the Chilean Andes. The best-known member is the common degu, O. degus, which is kept as a pet in various countries. Two of the four species of degus are nocturnal.

Classification 
This genus was first described in 1832 by the British zoologist Edward Turner Bennett.

Taxonomy 
The genus name Octodon comes from the Latin octo, eight, with reference to their teeth, molars and premolars having the shape of the number 8.

The full list of species is:

 O. bridgesii, Bridges's degu, found in central Chile
 O. degus, the common degu or degu, found in central Chile
 O. lunatus, the moon-toothed degu, found in central Chile
 O. pacificus, the Pacific degu or Mocha Island degu, found exclusively on Mocha Island, Chile
O. ricardojeda, Ricardo Ojeda's degu, found in western Argentina and Chile

Distribution 
In the wild, all species of degus live in the Andes, mainly in the mountains of Chile, to which most of them are endemic, aside from a few populations of O. ricardojeda in the neighboring province of Neuquén, Argentina. They are found between 0 and 1,800 m in altitude.

Description 
They are medium-sized octodontids. Their total body length varies between 200 and 390 mm, with a tail which measures between 81 and 170 mm and represents 70 to 80% of the head + body length. The coat color is grayish, or dull with orange highlights, and turns creamy yellow on the belly. The tail is carried slightly curved and is the same color as the body, and ends with a tuft of black hairs, with the extent of black depending on the species. The ears are quite large and protrude widely from the head, except in O. pacificus . The lower limbs are suitable for jumping, with pads on the soles of the paws that prevent slipping. The forelegs have four clawed fingers, along with a poorly developed fifth finger with a nail. The glans of the penis is characterized by a variable number of spikes, 5 or more in number, on each side.

Lifestyle 
They are both nocturnal and diurnal. Degus are primarily folivorous herbivores. Their diet varies according to annual vegetation cycles. The consumption of their own droppings (coprophagia) is practiced during times of scarcity. This provides them with a nutritional supplement thanks to the microbial fermentation that takes place in the cecum and optimizes the digestion of fibrous foods.

These social animals dig a burrow made of a series of tunnels where they live in small to large groups composed of both males and females.

Conservation status 
O. bridgesii (assessed as conspecific with O. ricardojeda) is considered vulnerable by the IUCN Red List, while O. pacificus is considered critically endangered. The other two species are considered of least concern.

References

External links

 
Rodent genera
Taxa named by Edward Turner Bennett